Shelley Lake is a small lake located entirely in the city of Spokane Valley, in the U.S. state of Washington. The lake is surrounded on three sides by the 248 lot gated community of Shelley Lake Estates. The lake is kept full by Saltese Creek, which is supplied by drainage canals from the Saltese Flats. Although an open lake, there are no above-ground outflows.

See also

Liberty Lake

References

Lakes of Washington (state)
Lakes of Spokane County, Washington